Red pine or Norway pine, Pinus resinosa, is a pine tree native to North America.

Red Pine may also refer to:

Trees
 Chinese red pine, two species
 Pinus massoniana, Chinese red pine
 Pinus tabuliformis, Southern Chinese red pine
 Pinus densiflora, Japanese red pine, a tree native to Japan and Korea
 Pinus taiwanensis, Taiwan red pine
 Pinus sylvestris, European red pine, Scots pine, etc.
 Dacrydium cupressinum, New Zealand red pine, a tree endemic to New Zealand

People
Red Pine (author), the pen name of author Bill Porter, American author born 1943
Chi Song or Master Red Pine (Chinese: 赤松), one of the legendary Taoist immortals